Ingrid Heggø (born 12 August 1961, in Høyanger) is a Norwegian politician for the Labour Party.

She was elected to the Norwegian Parliament from Sogn og Fjordane in 2005. She had previously served as a deputy representative during the term 1997–2001.

Heggø was a member of Høyanger municipality council from 1991 to 2003, serving the last eight years as deputy mayor. Since 2007 she is a member of the Labour Party central board.

References

1961 births
Living people
Members of the Storting
Sogn og Fjordane politicians
Labour Party (Norway) politicians
BI Norwegian Business School alumni
Women members of the Storting
21st-century Norwegian politicians
21st-century Norwegian women politicians
People from Høyanger